Hubert James Norman (7 January 1881 – 13 March 1948) was an English physician and president of the History of Medicine Society of the Royal Society of Medicine from 1947–48.

References 

Presidents of the History of Medicine Society
1881 births
1948 deaths
People from Winkleigh